Several vessels have been named Flora:

 was built at Yarmouth. She was captured early in her career and quickly recaptured. She traded to the Mediterranean and the Bahamas. She was last listed in 1813.
 was built in India. She first appeared in British records in 1801 as a West Indiaman. She was last listed in Lloyd's Register  (LR) in 1808.
 was launched at Narsipore.
 was a brig of 186 tons (bm) that the Bombay Dockyard built for the Bengal Pilot Service. She was sold in 1836 to become a local merchantman.

See also
, any one of eight ships of the French Navy
, any one of several British warships
HM Hired armed cutter 
 was launched at Calcutta. She spent her entire career as an East Indiaman but made only one voyage for the British East India Company (EIC). She was last listed in 1855.

Ship names